Patrick Blower (born 10 January 1959) is a British editorial cartoonist and painter whose work appears predominantly in the Daily Telegraph where he is the current chief political cartoonist. In 2021 he won the Political Cartoon Society’s Strube Spoon for runner-up political cartoonist of the year. He uses Blower mononymously when signing his cartoons for publication.

Biography

Early life and education 
Patrick Blower was born in Brussels to an English architect father, Michael Blower and Belgian mother, Bernadette (nee Muûls) who met whilst both were working at Brussels World's Fair in 1958. He is the eldest of six children and was educated at Farnham Grammar School and University College London where he read English Literature. In 2008 he gained an MA in Art & Space at Kingston University. He is a fluent French speaker.

Cartoons and illustration 
Soon after university, he took a one-way ticket to California and worked his way to New York where he lived for 18 months. He supported himself with labouring jobs whilst painting and cartooning in his spare time. His first published commission appeared in the East Village Eye. 
He returned to Britain and began freelancing as an illustrator after joining the government's Enterprise Allowance Scheme. His work has appeared in most British newspapers and magazines including The Times, Sunday Times, Mail on Sunday, The Guardian, Daily Express, Private Eye and The Spectator.
Blower succeeded JAK as the Evening Standard editorial cartoonist in 1997, remaining there until 2003. Shortly afterwards, he conceived a time-lapse animation technique named Livedraw and went on to produce regular animated cartoons for BBC Newsnight and the BBC 10 O'Clock News in addition to drawing weekly animated political cartoons for The Guardian from 2009-2011. 
He was filmed by the BBC in 2019 as he drew and talked about the process of conceiving a cartoon to a tight deadline. He co-produced the animation How Pandemics Spread for the launch of TED Ed and also created the drawings for an animation which was at the centre of an award-winning exhibition commemorating the centenary of The Spanish Flu for the Florence Nightingale Museum.
In 2017, he became a regular contributor to the Daily Telegraph and succeeded to chief political cartoonist in 2021.

Painting 
His work has been selected for exhibitions at the Mall Galleries including the Threadneedle Prize exhibition and The Lynn Painter-Stainers show. His work was also selected for the Royal Academy Summer Exhibition in 2021 and 2022.

Personal life 
Blower is married with three children and lives in London.

References

Bibliography
 Dictionary of Twentieth-Century British Cartoonists and Caricaturists, by Mark Bryant (2000) (Ashgate, Aldershot) ISBN 1-84014-286-3
 The Cartoon Century, by Timothy S Benson (2000) (Random House) ISBN 978-1905211593
 Britain’s best political cartoons, by Tim Benson (2021) (Random House) ISBN 978-1473596535
 Britain’s best ever political cartoons, by Tim Benson (2021) (John Murray Press) ISBN 978-1529334395
 Cartoons from the Daily Telegraph Best of Blower 2017-21, (2021) (Signature)

External links
Biography of Blower from the British Cartoon Archive, University of Kent 
An archive of material is available at www.patrickblower.com 
A further archive of material is available at www.blowercartoons.com 

British editorial cartoonists
Living people
People from Farnham
1959 births
Alumni of University College London